The I Avon Trophy was a non-championship Grand Prix which was held at the Castle Combe Circuit on 1 October 1955, three weeks after the end of the season. It was the inaugural running of the Avon Trophy, and the last race run to Formula One regulations to be held at the circuit.

The race was won from pole by American, Harry Schell, ahead of privateer Horace Gould, in second and Bob Gerard in third.

Background
The Castle Combe circuit, converted from an airfield just five years earlier, welcomed Formula One racing for the fourth consecutive year, having hosted the Joe Fry Memorial Trophy in previous years.

The inaugural Avon Trophy, although post-season and non-championship, was attended by numerous championship contenders from the 1955 season, as well as some new faces ahead of 1956. Among those who entered the race were American, Harry Schell, privateer Horace Gould and Frenchman, Louis Rosier. Peter Collins and future championship runner-up, Tony Brooks also attended.

Classification

Qualifying

Race

References
ChicaneF1 article

1955 Formula One races